Southern Rail may refer to

United States
 Charlotte Southern Railroad
 California Southern Railroad
 Norfolk Southern Railway

Australia
 Great Southern Rail Trail
 Journey Beyond, formerly Great Southern Rail

United Kingdom
 Southern Railway (UK) (a historical railway in the South of England)
 Southern (Govia Thameslink Railway) (the current brand name for services on the Southern routes of the Thameslink, Southern & Great Northern franchise)